Robot Monster (or Monster from Mars) is a 1953 independently made American black-and-white 3D science fiction film, remembered in later decades as one of the worst movies ever made. It was produced and directed by Phil Tucker, written by Wyott Ordung, and stars George Nader, Claudia Barrett, and George Barrows. The production company was Three Dimensional Pictures, Inc. The film was distributed by Astor Pictures.

Robot Monster tells the story of the alien robot Ro-Man's mission to Earth to destroy humanity. He manages to kill all but eight survivors, who have become immune to his death ray. Ro-Man runs afoul of the Great Guidance, his leader, when he becomes attracted to the human Alice. She is the eldest daughter of a surviving scientist, and he refuses to harm her. The Great Guidance must now come to Earth and finish what the Moon robot started.

Plot

Ro-Man Extension XJ-2 referred to as just Ro-Man (a creature with an ape-like body and an antenna-equipped helmet covering its head and emits electric flashes), has destroyed all human life on Earth with a Calcinator death ray to prevent Humanity from challenging his race, except for eight humans who remain alive in a protected facility. The survivors are a professor, whose name is never mentioned; his wife; their two daughters, Alice and Carla; their young son, Johnny; the professor's assistant, Roy; and space pilots Jason and McCloud (neither of whom is seen or heard). Both pilots depart in a rocket ship for an orbiting space platform. All eight have developed an immunity to Ro-Man's death ray, having received an experimental antibiotic serum developed by the professor intended to cure all diseases.

Ro-Man must complete the destruction of all humans, even if it means his physically killing them one by one, before his mission to subjugate the Earth is complete. After fruitless negotiations, Ro-Man destroys Jason and McCloud's spaceship that had been sent into space to escape, along with the space platform. The Professor uses the machine intended to contact Jason and McCloud to instead contact Ro-Man, pleading for him to let them go as they pose no threat to him. Ro-Man instead demands to talk to Alice alone, who agrees despite her family's protests. When Johnny leaves to find Ro-Man, Alice ventures out with Roy to find him. Johnny confronts Ro-Man and reveals his immunity to the death ray, causing Ro-Man to begin planning a method to counteract this immunity.

Alice and Roy find Johnny, and after inexplicably kissing each other while still in danger, return to the facility. Alice and Roy announce to the professor their desire to marry. The Professor then declares it the biggest event of the year. Ro-Man contacts Great Guidance (referred to as "The Great One"), leader of the Ro-Man Empire, to announce his plan, and is told that he must complete this goal before the Earth finishes revolving. The marriage is conducted, with the Professor asking the Lord for a victory in Mankind's struggle, Ro-Man discovers Carla outside the facility and strangles her.

Ro-Man's mission is waylaid, however, when he develops an illogical attraction to Alice and cannot bring himself to eliminate her, asking the Great One if he may keep one human but is demanded to continue the mission. Ro-Man rediscovers Alice and Roy, and throws Roy off a cliff. He explains to Alice that the source of his energy lies in his cave, where he takes her and attempts to woo her before being interrupted by the Professor's broadcast. They ask for a quick death at the ravine, and Ro-Man agrees. Immediately after this, the Great One contacts him, angry at him for rejecting the plan to keep the girl and accusing him of bearing free will in violation of Ro-Man law. He gives Ro-Man one last chance to destroy the girl, which Ro-Man refuses to. Johnny distracts him, allowing the family to save Alice. Both Johnny and Ro-Man are suddenly killed by the Great One with a Calcinator blast. The Great One continues the genocide with Cosmic June Rays, which cause prehistoric reptiles to appear; and psychotronic vibrations, which "smash the planet Earth out of the universe".

But Johnny is alive, having just awakened from a concussion-induced fever dream. Up to now, all that has happened has just been his nightmare. His sisters, their mother, and the two scientists, whom the family met while picnicking in Bronson Canyon, rejoice at finding him. Johnny and his family invite the scientists home for dinner; they accept.

Suddenly, Ro-Man, his arms raised in a threatening manner after having just arrived on Earth, walks out of his cave directly toward the audience.

Cast
 George Nader as Roy
 Claudia Barrett as Alice
 Selena Royle (credited as Selena Royale) as Mother
 John Mylong as The Professor
 Gregory Moffett as Johnny
 Pamela Paulson as Carla
 George Barrows as Ro-Man/Great Guidance
 John Brown as Voice of Ro-Man/Great Guidance

Production
Twenty-five-year-old writer/director Tucker made Robot Monster in four days for an estimated $16,000. Except for a few scenes at a house in Los Angeles and a building site near Dodger Stadium, most footage was filmed outdoors in Bronson Canyon, the site of innumerable motion pictures and TV settings. Principal photography on Robot Monster wrapped on March 23, 1953.

Robot Monsters very low budget did not allow for a robot costume as first intended, so Tucker hired his friend Barrows, who had made his own gorilla suit, to play Ro-Man; Tucker then added a space helmet similar to those used in Republic serials such as Radar Men from the Moon.
 
Robot Monster is similar in its plot to Invaders from Mars, released a month earlier by 20th Century Fox. Both films contain a young boy, stumbling upon an alien invasion, who is captured as he struggles to save his family and himself. As the alien commences the final destruction of Earth, the boy awakens to find it was all a dream. Barrett recalled in an interview that the film's original screenplay was designed as reality, but director Tucker changed his mind and then shot a new twist ending that showed the film's story has been a boy's dream that is about to come true.

In Robot Monsters opening credits, "N. A. Fischer Chemical Products" is given prominent credit for the "Billion Bubble Machine", used as part of Ro-Man's communication device for reporting to his superior, the Great Guidance.

The film was preceded in theatres by Stardust in Your Eyes, a one-reel 3D monologue by comic/impressionist Trustin Howard, performing under his stage name "Slick Slavin."

3D
Robot Monster was shot and projected in dual-strip, polarized 3D. The stereoscopic photography in the film is considered by many critics to be high quality, especially for a film whose crew had little experience with the newly developed camera rig. Producer Al Zimbalist later told The New York Times that shooting the film in 3D (which involved using another camera) added an extra $4,510.54 to the budget.

Special effects
Robot Monsters special effects include stock footage from One Million B.C. (1940), Lost Continent (1951), and Flight to Mars (1951); a brief appearance of the Rocketship X-M (1950) spaceship boarding; and a matte painting of the ruins of New York City from Captive Women (1952).

Film score
Robot Monsters music score was composed by Elmer Bernstein, who also composed Cat Women of the Moon the same year, and later, the more prestigious The Great Escape, The Magnificent Seven, The Ten Commandments, Michael Jackson's Thriller music video, and Ghostbusters.

Bernstein recalled he was stuck in a period where he was "greylisted" because of his left-wing politics and only offered minor films, but said he enjoyed the challenge of trying to help a film. Ordung stated that Bernstein scored the film with an eight-piece orchestra, and Capitol Records expressed interest in producing an album. One critic told how he had watched the film as a teenager when it was first shown on television in 1954 and said it was "one of Elmer Bernstein's best very early scores."

Release
Robot Monster was released by Astor Pictures on June 24, 1953, at a runtime of 62 minutes. It was originally released with the Three Dimension Pictures short Stardust in Your Eyes, starring nightclub comedian Trustin Howard as Slick Slaven. It grossed $1,000,000 during its initial theatrical release, more than 62 times its original investment.

Reception

Contemporary
The December 1952 review in Variety noted, "Judged on the basis of novelty, as a showcase for the Tru-Stereo Process, Robot Monster comes off surprisingly well, considering the extremely limited budget ($50,000) and schedule on which the film was shot".

In June 1953, the Los Angeles Times called it "a crazy mixed up movie ... even children may be a little bored by it all" and Harrison's Reports, the following month, called it "the poorest 3-D picture that [has] been made so far." Adding, "the story is completely illogical, and the supposed monsters from another planet are laughable. Even the acting, at times, is ridiculous".

In December 1953, the Los Angeles Times reported that "theater men" considered the film "one of the top turkeys of the year."

Legacy
The film holds a 36% approval rating at the film review aggregator website Rotten Tomatoes, based on 14 reviews, with an average rating of 4.15/10.

The film is frequently considered one of the worst movies ever made, with film historian Leonard Maltin writing in his 2009 Movie Guide, "[Robot Monster is] one of the genuine legends of Hollywoodembarrassingly, hilariously awful [...] just dig that bubble-machine with the TV antenna."

Aftermath
In December 1953, it was reported that Tucker tried to commit suicide at the Hollywood Knickerbocker Hotel. He was only saved because he had written a suicide letter and sent it to a newspaper, which sent a reporter and some detectives to the hotel. He was discovered with a pass in his pocket from the psychopathic ward of a veteran's hospital. In the letter, Tucker said he had not been paid for Robot Monster and was unable to get a job. "When I was refused a jobeven as an usher", Tucker wrote, "I finally realized my future in the film industry was bleak." It was revealed that Tucker and the producer had quarreled, and film exhibitors had instructions not to let Tucker in to see the film unless he paid admission.

In Keep Watching the Skies!, a comprehensive history of 1950s and early 1960s American science-fiction films, author Bill Warren claimed that Tucker's attempted suicide was due to depression and a dispute with the film's distributor, who had allegedly refused to pay Tucker his contracted percentage of the film's profits.

The actors connected to Robot Monster included George Nader, who won the Golden Globe in 1955 as "Most Promising Male Newcomer of the Year" (although his award was not tied to his Robot Monster performance). He signed with Universal Studios, where he starred only in secondary features. 

Selena Royle, an MGM stock player, had a durable film career beginning in 1941, but it ended in 1951 when she was branded a Communist sympathizer. She refused to appear before the House Committee on Un-American Activities and eventually cleared her name. By then, the damage to her reputation had already been done; she made only two additional films, Robot Monster being her last.

In popular culture
 A scene from the film was used by The Cars in their music video for the song "You Might Think".
 In the Rocko's Modern Life episode "Popcorn Pandemonium", Rocko and Heffer watch an old monster movie on Ed Bighead's television (from his driveway); the monster in the film is a creature with an antennae-topped space helmet for a head and an ape body, a clear homage to Ro-Man.
 The film was featured in a 1986 episode of the Canned Film Festival.
 Ro-Man is seen in the 2003 film Looney Tunes: Back in Action.
 In the 2010 animated film Megamind, the character Minion (voiced by David Cross) resembles Ro-Man, with the body of a gorilla and a transparent head with a fish in it.
 It was the feature film of the 1989 episode 107 of Mystery Science Theater 3000.
 SCP-2006, a creature from the SCP Foundation, prefers to take the form of Ro-Man.
 In the 2012 series Teenage Mutant Ninja Turtles, the Kraang operate gorilla bodies which are based on Ro-Man.
 In the Disney cartoon Milo Murphy's Law, Milo and Sarah's favorite sci-fi series, Dr. Zone has two characters. One is Dr. Zone and the other is Time Ape, whose body is similar to Ro-Man but wears boxer shorts and his head is a time clock.
 In 2022, Rifftrax released their own riffed version of the movie.

See also
 List of 3D films pre-2005
 List of films considered the worst

References

Notes

Citations

Bibliography

 Hayes, R. M. 3-D Movies: "A History and Filmography of Stereoscopic Cinema. Jefferson, North Carolina: McFarland Classics, 1998. .
 Mitchell, Charles P. A Guide to Apocalyptic Cinema. Portsmouth, New Hampshire: Greenwood Publishing Group, 2001. .
 Parla, Paul and Charles P.  Mitchell. "Claudia Barrett interview". Screen Sirens Scream!: Interviews with 20 Actresses from Science Fiction, Horror, Film Noir and Mystery Movies, 1930s to 1960s. Jefferson, North Carolina: McFarland  & Company, 2009. .
 Rux, Bruce. Hollywood Vs. the Aliens: The Motion Picture Industry's Participation in UFO Disinformation. Berkeley, California: North Atlantic Books/Frog, Ltd., 1997. .
 Spencer, Kristopher. Film And Television Scores, 1950-1979: A Critical Survey by Genre. Jefferson, North Carolina: McFarland & Company, 2008. .
 Strick, Philip. Science Fiction Movies. London: Octopus Books Limited, 1976. .
 Warren, Bill. Keep Watching The Skies, American Science Fiction Movies of the Fifties, Vol I: 1950–1957. Jefferson, North Carolina: McFarland & Company, 1982. .
 Zone, Ray. 3-D Revolution: The History of Modern Stereoscopic Cinema. Lexington, Kentucky: University Press of Kentucky, 2012. .

External links

Mystery Science Theater 3000 
 
 Episode guide: 107- Robot Monster (with shorts: Radar Men from the Moon, episode 4-Flight to Destruction and episode 5-Murder Car)

1950s science fiction films
1953 horror films
1953 films
American black-and-white films
American independent films
American dystopian films
1950s English-language films
Films scored by Elmer Bernstein
Films directed by Phil Tucker
American post-apocalyptic films
American robot films
American science fiction horror films
American monster movies
1953 3D films
American 3D films
Articles containing video clips
Films about nightmares
1950s monster movies
1953 directorial debut films
Films shot in Los Angeles
American exploitation films
1950s American films
Alien invasions in films